USS Sumter may refer to the following ships of the United States Navy:

 , the former CSS General Sumter, an cottonclad ram captured in 1862
  (previously AP-97), an attack transport; formerly Iberville
 , a tank landing ship

See also
  a Confederate States Navy vessel in the American Civil War
  a gunboat of the Union Navy.

United States Navy ship names